Brigadier General William Dorrance Beach (June 18, 1856 – June 18, 1932) was a United States Army officer active during World War I.

Early life
Beach was born in Brooklyn, New York, the son of Joshua Munson Beach. After attending a private school in New Jersey, Beach went to public schools in New York before entering the United States Military Academy (USMA) at West Point, New York. He graduated number twenty-four of sixty-four in the class of 1879. Among his fellow classmates included several general officers of the future, such as Hunter Liggett, John S. Mallory, James A. Irons, Lloyd M. Brett, Albert L. Mills, John A. Johnston, Henry A. Greene, Frederick S. Foltz and Samuel W. Miller.

Military career
Upon graduation, Beach was commissioned in the Third Cavalry and performed frontier duty until 1883. He participated in the Ute Expedition in 1879 and from 1882 to 1883 he was on the Apache Expedition. From 1884 to 1888, Beach was an assistant professor at the USMA, after which he was on the Mexican border with troops in 1891 and 1892. From 1892 to 1898, Beach was an instructor at the Infantry and Cavalry School at Fort Leavenworth, Kansas.

During the Spanish–American War, he was a major and Chief Engineer of the cavalry division in the Fifth Corps in Cuba. From 1900 to 1902, he was in the Philippines, and from 1903 to 1906 he was on duty with the War Department General Staff as chief of the military information division. He traveled back to Cuba and was governor of Santa Clara Province. From 1910 to 1912, Beach again traveled to the Philippines and became Chief of Staff of the Philippine Division.

In 1916, he commanded the Eighth Cavalry on the Mexican border, and in 1917, after the American entry into World War I, he became a brigadier general and commanded the 176th Brigade. From May to September 1918, Beach commanded the 88th Division, the 176th Brigade's parent formation. Upon his return to the United States, he performed as executive officer of Camp Jackson, South Carolina, until his retirement in 1920.

Beach retired as a colonel but was promoted on the retired list to brigadier general in 1927.

Awards
Beach received two Silver Star Citations and the Army Distinguished Service Medal from the United States. He also received the Frenfh Croix de Guerre with palms and Officier of the Legion of Honor from France. His DSM citation reads:

Death and legacy
William Dorrance Beach died at the age of seventy-six on June 18, 1932.

References

Bibliography
 Davis, Henry Blaine. Generals in Khaki. Raleigh, NC: Pentland Press, 1998.  
 Marquis Who's Who, Inc. Who Was Who in American History, the Military. Chicago: Marquis Who's Who, 1975.  
 "Valor Awards for William Dorrance Beach." Valor Awards for William Dorrance Beach. Military Times, n.d. Web. 17 Aug. 2016. <http://valor.militarytimes.com/recipient.php?recipientid=17251>.

External links

1856 births
1932 deaths
United States Army generals of World War I
United States Military Academy alumni
Recipients of the Silver Star
United States Army generals
People from Brooklyn
Officiers of the Légion d'honneur
American military personnel of the Spanish–American War
Recipients of the Distinguished Service Medal (US Army)
Recipients of the Croix de Guerre 1914–1918 (France)
United States Military Academy faculty
Military personnel from New York City
United States Army Cavalry Branch personnel